Panique, also released as Panic, is a 1946 French film directed by Julien Duvivier starring Michel Simon and Viviane Romance. The screenplay is based on the novel Les Fiançailles de M. Hire by Georges Simenon.

It was shot at the Victorine Studios in Nice, with sets designed by the art director Serge Piménoff.

In 1989 Patrice Leconte made a second film based on the same novel Monsieur Hire with Michel Blanc in the title role.

Plot
Alice is a young woman who has just been released from prison after taking the rap for a robbery committed by her boyfriend, Alfred. She arrives in town the night after a woman's murder. The next morning, Alice and Alfred pretend they are meeting for the first time, as the police know she covered up a crime for someone and are eager to discover the real criminal. Alice's neighbor, the eccentric and misanthropic loner Monsieur Hire, immediately falls for her. He warns her about Alfred, advising that she should ask him about the murder.

Although Alfred is initially unforthcoming, he admits he is the murderer. He was sleeping with the woman and killed her for her money. When Alice tells him that Hire knows of his crime, he quickly sets a plan into action. He begins planting suspicions among the locals, who already dislike and distrust Hire. Meanwhile, Alice leads Hire on, and plants the murdered woman's handbag in his apartment. Later, Alfred tells his friends to gather Hire's neighbors, who search the apartment and find the handbag.

After his friends incite a violent mob, Alfred urges Alice to call Hire and beg him to leave work and return home. When he arrives and is confronted by the bloodthirsty crowd, Hire flees to the rooftops, where he slips. Despite the efforts of police and firefighters to save him, he falls to his death. Alfred and a regretful Alice slink off, thinking they have successfully framed Hire. However, the police discover a photograph of Alfred committing the murder on Hire's body. They wait to close in on Alfred as the movie ends.

Cast

 Viviane Romance as Alice
 Michel Simon as M. Hire
 Max Dalban as Capoulade
 Émile Drain as M. Breteuil
 Guy Favières as M. Sauvage
 Florencie as Inspector Marcelin
 Charles Dorat as Inspector Michelet
 Lucas Gridoux as M. Fortin
 Marcel Pérès as Cermanutti
 Lita Recio as Marcelle

Other notable appearances include J.F. Martial as M. Joubet, Paul Bernard as Alfred, and Suzanne Desprès as La cartomancienne.

Assessments
One study of French cinema places this film in its social and political context alongside other French films of the period:

In the years immediately following World War II, filmmakers were judged according to how their films reflected their implicit judgement of the behavior of the French under German occupation.  The tale of "mob misrule" and "scapegoating" is played out in a setting that includes all the prototypical elements that identify it as a microcosm of French society: the cafe bar and terrace, small shops, church, modest hotel, "the selling of veal cutlets and Camembert". Panique has been described as "a strong and memorable screen denunciation of the relations between French people in the confused aftermath of the war" and "a harsh but thoughtfully delineated portrait of a society riven by mistrust and suspicion". Duvivier commented with respect to the film that "we are far from people who love each other". Defenders of French society responded that his years in exile during the war made him unfit to assess the French society that emerged from the war. Later critics have appreciated how the film makes references to the French Revolution as well as to the very recent past with playful puns and allusions rather than forthright statements, allowing the viewer to make the connections. In this analysis, self-censorship and the political context that made a careful examination of the recent past impossible forced Duvivier "to speak in more highly elaborated codes. It is the constraints themselves that produce a film compelling enough to demand an unraveling, and that distinguish Panique from the more journalistic renderings of Occupation stories that were made in later decades."

Release
Panique had a gala premiere at Palais de Chaillot on December 19, 1946. It then opened in Paris on January 15, 1947. The film was described by film historian Lenny Borger as being a box office failure in France on its initial release. The film opened in New York on November 27, 1947.

References

Sources

External links
 
 
  Panique at “Cinema-francais“ (French)
Panique: Panic Attack an essay by James Quandt at the Criterion Collection

1946 films
French black-and-white films
1940s French-language films
Films based on Belgian novels
Films based on works by Georges Simenon
Films directed by Julien Duvivier
Films shot at Victorine Studios
French crime drama films
1946 crime drama films
Film noir
1940s French films